Samuel Lucius–Thomas Howland House (also known as the Samuel Lucas–Thomas Howland House) is a historic house at 36 North Street in Plymouth, Massachusetts located within the Plymouth Village Historic District, as a contributing property. The house is located adjacent to Cole's Hill from which it is separated by North Street. The earliest part of the house is estimated to be constructed circa 1637–1640, which would make it one of the oldest houses in Massachusetts if accurate. In 1697 Thomas Howland transferred the property to Samuel Lucas. The Jackson and Russell families occupied the property in the nineteenth and early twentieth centuries until 1939. As of 2019, the house remains a private residence.

Images

References

See also
 List of the oldest buildings in Massachusetts

1640 establishments in Massachusetts
Plymouth, Massachusetts
Houses in Plymouth, Massachusetts
Houses completed in 1640
First period houses in Massachusetts (1620–1659)